The clothing of the Baloch people consists of various styles of kameez and shalwar, turban, shoes and head scarfs.

Men's Balochi suit
The men's shalwar kameez consists of a very baggy shalwar{troser which uses large lengths of cloth. The kameez is also loose, which traditionally is long with long sleeves The Balochi shalwar kameez is similar to the styles by Pashtuns. The present Balochi shalwar kameez replaced the earlier version which consisted of a robe to the ankles and a shalwar using cloth of up to 40 yards.

Women's Balochi suit
The female Balochi suit consists of the head scarf, long dress and a shalwar. Balochi women wear loose dresses which are embroidered in local designs which include Balochi silk-thread chain-stitch embroidery. Balochi embroidery alone has 118 different basic designs. 

Mahtab Norouzi was an Iranian Baluchi master artisan, she was known for her textiles and women's clothing .

Turban
Men traditionally wear various styles of the turban known as the pagri.

Balochi shoes

Balochi bags

See also
 Balochi needlework
 Sindhi dress
 Shalwar kameez
 Khyber Pakhtunkhwa clothing

References

Pakistani clothing by ethnicity
Pakistani culture
Baloch culture
Embroidery